Franziska Maria Elisabeth Haussmann (April 15, 1818 – April 4, 1853) was a Slovenian writer and poet of German origin.

Hausmann is generally hailed as the first female poet to write in Slovene, although that claim has been contested. Most of her work consisted of patriotic poems and love poems.

Hausmann's poems preceded the existence of a national literary magazine, and were subsequently published in weekly newspapers. Her first published poem, "Vojaka izhod" (A Soldier's exit), appeared in Celske novine (Celje News) in 1848, and her other poetry appeared both in that journal and Slovenija. Her work was influential with Slovenian populists and also paved the way for more women writers gain entry into the Slovenian literary scene and public sphere.

References

1818 births
1853 deaths
Slovenian people of German descent
Slovenian women poets
Slovenian poets
19th-century women writers